"Dance Me Up" is a song by English glam rock singer Gary Glitter, written by Glitter with Mike Leander and Eddie (Edward John) Seago and produced by Mike Leander. It was released as the second single from his fifth studio album, Boys Will Be Boys (1984). The single features the non-album track, "Too Young to Dance" as its B-side, which was exclusive to the single.

The single was released in Europe in June 1984.  On 21 June 1984, Glitter opened Top of the Pops with the song, despite it being at No. 48 on the UK Singles Chart that week. At that time, Top of the Pops had a policy of not showing any songs outside of the Top 40. Following the Top of the Pops performance, the song peaked at No. 25 on the UK Singles Chart.

Track listing
 12" Maxi (ARIST 22570)
"Dance Me Up (Extended Mix)"
"Too Young to Dance"
"All That Glitters (Medley)"

 12" Single
"Dance Me Up (12" Extended Mix)"
"Too Young to Dance"

 7" Single
"Dance Me Up"
"Too Young to Dance"

Chart performance

References

External links
 

1984 singles
Gary Glitter songs
Songs written by Mike Leander
Song recordings produced by Mike Leander
Songs written by Gary Glitter
Arista Records singles
1984 songs
Songs written by Eddie Seago